Berufswertigkeit (German, with Berufs meaning professional or occupational + wertigkeit meaning value or quantity) is a concept of comparative evaluation concerning the competences of persons with different formal educational achievements. It derives from the requirements of modern professional business practice and enables comparisons respectively an assessment of the considered persons or educational achievements from the specific view of professional practice.

Concept 
Berufswertigkeit orientates oneself on a modern occupation term which covers a pronounced functionality and a high identification of the working persons with their tasks, actions and areas of responsibility (comprehensive professionalism).

With this measurement concept the assessment perspective of the professional world is chosen and regarded for the first time. Therefore, the requirements of professional practice and expectations of companies towards their employees respectively of the operational environment towards employees and executives in companies and towards a comprehensive professionalism independent of formal pre-qualification are set in the center of attention and less the theoretical comparison of defined competence fields. The term is in this respect based on the term ‘employability’ from the bologna process which claims a specific orientation of qualifications on the requirements of professional practice.

Furthermore, the term ‘Berufswertigkeit’ stands for a comparative moment for different professional qualifications and professional operational areas. Herein the term is based on the discussion of ‘equality’ of different formal forms of achievements. These discussions are considered insofar as the concept ‘Berufswertigkeit’ provides a standard of comparison which locates an occupational equality as a comparable value of the considered employees of the company through the concrete balance of detected fulfillments of requirements of the employees with different formal achievements. So this orientates largely independent from formal qualifications on the value contribution for the company. To realize a scientifically based assessment concept several working stages have been realized. (concept 2006, survey 2007, survey 2009, survey 2011)

Working stages 
The obtained results of examinations from the view of Berufswertigkeit shall and can serve to support scientific and public discussions in education. These can be orientated on:
(a) comparability (equality discourse) and promotion of the transition between different education systems (comparative objective),
(b) support of a general recognition and also motivation, e.g. of school leavers to acquire an educational achievement in the direction of their own professional activities (promotion objective),
(c) further development of the several frameworks of qualifications like for example curricula, forms and terms of achievement due to feedback from professional practice.
The concept Berufswertigkeit was coined in two research studies 2007 and 2009 among others by Prof. Dr. Matthias Klumpp

Literature 
 Klumpp, M.; Kriebel, K.; Beschorner, H.; Buschfeld, D.; Dilger, B.; Diart, M.: Berufswertigkeit konkret. Wissenschaftlicher Abschlussbericht. Köln 2010 
 Diart, M.; Klumpp, M.; Krins, Chr.; Schaumann, U.: Vergleich der Berufswertigkeit von beruflichen Weiterbildungsabschlüssen und hochschulischen Abschlüssen. Köln 2008
 Klumpp, M. (2007): ild Schriftenreihe Logistikforschung, Band 5. Essen 2007, Begriff und Konzept Berufswertigkeit

External links 
 Klumpp, M.: Sectoral Qualifications Framework in Logistics – Problems, Concepts and Advantages, ERASMUS Guest Lecture TU Istanbul, 13./14. Dezember 2010 Istanbul, Sectoral Qualifications Framework in Logitics
 Klumpp, M. / Peisert, R. / Keuschen, T.: Sectoral Qualifications Framework Logistics: What can we learn from Berufswertigkeit and Graduate Surveys? HICL, TU Hamburg-Harburg, 2./3. September 2010, SQR
 Klumpp, M. / Kriebel, K.: Berufswertigkeit als Konzept zur qualifikationsadäquaten Integration von ausländischen Mitarbeitern in Unternehmen, 7. Internationaler Tag Hochschule München, 12. November 2009 München, Internationaler Tag Muenchen
Handwerk NRW
Nachfolgestudie
 Abschlussbericht Berufswertigkeit, Berufswertigkeit Langfassung
 Klumpp, M.; Kriebel, K.; Beschorner, H.; Buschfeld, D.; Dilger, B.; Diart, M., Berufswertigkeit Kurzfassung

Vocational education